David Sykes (born 4 October 1942) is a former Australian rules footballer who played with Fitzroy in the Victorian Football League (VFL).

Footballer
Sykes, who was recruited out of the Victorian Amateur Football Association, played as a forward and ruckman for Fitzroy. He had two stints at the club and in between spent some time as captain-coach of Cobden, in the Hampden Football League.

On 6 July 1963, playing at centre half-back, he was a member of the young and inexperienced Fitzroy team that comprehensively and unexpectedly defeated Geelong, 9.13 (67) to 3.13 (31) in the 1963 Miracle Match.

Sykes, North Albury won the 1964 Ovens & Murray Football League best & fairest award, the Morris Medal with Jim Sandral, Corowa, both on 22 votes.

He was later both a state and league coach in Sydney.

See also
 1963 Miracle Match

Notes

1942 births
Australian rules footballers from Victoria (Australia)
Fitzroy Football Club players
Cobden Football Club players
Living people